HMS Netley was the American schooner Nimrod, launched at Baltimore in 1803 or 1804. The Royal Navy seized her in 1807, purchased her in 1808, and renamed her Netley. She participated in the 1810 invasion of Guadeloupe and also was the cause of an incident at Baltimore that same year. She was probably sold in 1814.

American schooner
Nimrod was launched in 1803 or 1804, at Baltimore.

In 1807 she was at Baltimore with a cargo of sugar, cocoa, coffee, sarsaparilla, and hides, having returned from a voyage to the West Indies. She set sail again carrying a Spanish certificate attesting that she was carrying wheat to the British army in Spain. Although such a voyage would have been illegal under the United States's Embargo Act of 1807, the hope was that the certificate would protect Nimrod from seizure by the British.

The British nevertheless seized Nimrod. On 27 September 1807  captured Nimrod, H. Nicholayson, master.

Royal Navy service
After the Royal Navy seized her in 1807, it purchased her in 1808. Lieutenant Jackson was her commander between 1809 and 1812.

Netley, Lieutenant Jackson, participated in the capture of Guadeloupe in January and February 1810. In 1847 the Admiralty awarded the Naval General Service Medal with clasp "Guadaloupe" to all surviving participants of the campaign.

Netley then sailed to Baltimore for supplies and possibly dispatches. While she was there local residents of Fells Point heard that she had an impressed American on board. A deputation came to the brig, confronted Jackson, and informed him that he had one hour to release the American, which he did, sailing away shortly thereafter.

Lieutenant G. Green replaced Jackson in 1812.

Fate
Netley went into Ordinary in 1813 and was probably sold in 1814.

Notes, citations, and references

Notes

Citations

References

 

1800s ships
Ships built in Baltimore
Captured ships
Schooners of the Royal Navy